Ammonium sulfate (American English and international scientific usage; ammonium sulphate in British English); (NH4)2SO4, is an inorganic salt with a number of commercial uses. The most common use is as a soil fertilizer. It contains 21% nitrogen and 24% sulfur.

Uses 
The primary use of ammonium sulfate is as a fertilizer for alkaline soils. In the soil the ammonium ion is released and forms a small amount of acid, lowering the pH balance of the soil, while contributing essential nitrogen for plant growth. The main disadvantage to the use of ammonium sulfate is its low nitrogen content relative to ammonium nitrate, which elevates transportation costs.

It is also used as an agricultural spray adjuvant for water-soluble insecticides, herbicides, and fungicides. There, it functions to bind iron and calcium cations that are present in both well water and plant cells. It is particularly effective as an adjuvant for 2,4-D (amine), glyphosate, and glufosinate herbicides.

Laboratory use 
Ammonium sulfate precipitation is a common method for protein purification by precipitation. As the ionic strength of a solution increases, the solubility of proteins in that solution decreases. Ammonium sulfate is extremely soluble in water due to its ionic nature, therefore it can "salt out" proteins by precipitation. Due to the high dielectric constant of water, the dissociated salt ions being cationic ammonium and anionic sulfate are readily solvated within hydration shells of water molecules. The significance of this substance in the purification of compounds stems from its ability to become more so hydrated compared to relatively more nonpolar molecules and so the desirable nonpolar molecules coalesce and precipitate out of the solution in a concentrated form. This method is called salting out and necessitates the use of high salt concentrations that can reliably dissolve in the aqueous mixture. The percentage of the salt used is in comparison to the maximal concentration of the salt in the mixture can dissolve. As such, although high concentrations are needed for the method to work adding an abundance of the salt, over 100%, can also oversaturate the solution, therefore, contaminating the nonpolar precipitate with salt precipitate. A high salt concentration, which can be achieved by adding or increasing the concentration of ammonium sulfate in a solution, enables protein separation based on a decrease in protein solubility; this separation may be achieved by centrifugation. Precipitation by ammonium sulfate is a result of a reduction in solubility rather than protein denaturation, thus the precipitated protein can be solubilized through the use of standard buffers. Ammonium sulfate precipitation provides a convenient and simple means to fractionate complex protein mixtures.

In the analysis of rubber lattices, volatile fatty acids are analyzed by precipitating rubber with a 35% ammonium sulfate solution, which leaves a clear liquid from which volatile fatty acids are regenerated with sulfuric acid and then distilled with steam. Selective precipitation with ammonium sulfate, opposite to the usual precipitation technique which uses acetic acid, does not interfere with the determination of volatile fatty acids.

Food additive 
As a food additive, ammonium sulfate is considered generally recognized as safe (GRAS) by the U.S. Food and Drug Administration, and in the European Union it is designated by the E number E517. It is used as an acidity regulator in flours and breads.

Other uses 
In the treatment of drinking water, ammonium sulfate is used in combination with chlorine to generate monochloramine for disinfection.

Ammonium sulfate is used on a small scale in the preparation of other ammonium salts, especially ammonium persulfate.

Ammonium sulfate is listed as an ingredient for many United States vaccines per the Centers for Disease Control.

A saturated solution of ammonium sulfate in heavy water (D2O) is used as an external standard in sulfur (33S) NMR spectroscopy with shift value of 0 ppm.

Ammonium sulfate has also been used in flame retardant compositions acting much like diammonium phosphate. As a flame retardant, it increases the combustion temperature of the material, decreases maximum weight loss rates, and causes an increase in the production of residue or char. Its flame retardant efficacy can be enhanced by blending it with ammonium sulfamate. It has been used in aerial firefighting.

Ammonium sulfate has been used as a wood preservative, but due to its hygroscopic nature, this use has been largely discontinued because of associated problems with metal fastener corrosion, dimensional instability, and finish failures.

Preparation 
Ammonium sulfate is made by treating ammonia with sulfuric acid:
 2 NH3 + H2SO4 → (NH4)2SO4
A mixture of ammonia gas and water vapor is introduced into a reactor that contains a saturated solution of ammonium sulfate and about 2 to 4% of free sulfuric acid at 60 °C. Concentrated sulfuric acid is added to keep the solution acidic, and to retain its level of free acid. The heat of reaction keeps reactor temperature at 60 °C. Dry, powdered ammonium sulfate may be formed by spraying sulfuric acid into a reaction chamber filled with ammonia gas. The heat of reaction evaporates all water present in the system, forming a powdery salt. Approximately 6,000 million tons were produced in 1981.

Ammonium sulfate also is manufactured from gypsum (CaSO4·2H2O). Finely divided gypsum is added to an ammonium carbonate solution. Calcium carbonate precipitates as a solid, leaving ammonium sulfate in the solution.
 (NH4)2CO3 + CaSO4 → (NH4)2SO4 + CaCO3

Ammonium sulfate occurs naturally as the rare mineral mascagnite in volcanic fumaroles and due to coal fires on some dumps.

Properties 
Ammonium sulfate becomes ferroelectric at temperatures below –49.5 °C.  At room temperature it crystallises in the orthorhombic system, with cell sizes of a = 7.729 Å, b = 10.560 Å, c = 5.951 Å. When chilled into the ferrorelectric state, the symmetry of the crystal changes to space group Pna21.

Reactions 
Ammonium sulfate decomposes upon heating above , first forming ammonium bisulfate. Heating at higher temperatures results in decomposition into ammonia, nitrogen, sulfur dioxide, and water.

As a salt of a strong acid (H2SO4) and weak base (NH3), its solution is acidic; pH of 0.1 M solution is 5.5. In aqueous solution the reactions are those of NH4+ and SO4−2 ions. For example, addition of barium chloride, precipitates out barium sulfate. The filtrate on evaporation yields ammonium chloride.

Ammonium sulfate forms many double salts (ammonium metal sulfates) when its solution is mixed with equimolar solutions of metal sulfates and the solution is slowly evaporated. With trivalent metal ions, alums such as ferric ammonium sulfate are formed. Double metal sulfates include ammonium cobaltous sulfate, ferrous diammonium sulfate, ammonium nickel sulfate which are known as Tutton's salts and ammonium ceric sulfate. Anhydrous double sulfates of ammonium also occur in the Langbeinites family. The ammonia produced has a pungent smell and is toxic.

Airborne particles of evaporated ammonium sulfate comprise approximately 30% of fine particulate pollution worldwide.

Legislation and control 

In November 2009, a ban on ammonium sulfate, ammonium nitrate and calcium ammonium nitrate fertilizers was imposed in the former Malakand Division—comprising the Upper Dir, Lower Dir, Swat, Chitral and Malakand districts of the North West Frontier Province (NWFP) of Pakistan, by the NWFP government, following reports that they were used by militants to make explosives. In January 2010, these substances were also banned in Afghanistan for the same reason.

See also 
Ammonium sulfate precipitation

References

Further reading 
 Properties: UNIDO and International Fertilizer Development Center (1998), Fertilizer Manual, Kluwer Academic Publishers, .

External links 
 
Calculators: surface tensions, and densities, molarities and molalities of aqueous ammonium sulfate

Ammonium compounds
Sulfates
Fire suppression agents
Inorganic fertilizers
Food additives
Food stabilizers
E-number additives